International Buddhist Confederation is the biggest religious Buddhist confederation, based in Delhi, India. The architect of the International Buddhist Confederation is Lama Lobzang. This confederation is named as the first organization which unites Buddhists from the whole world.

See also 
World Fellowship of Buddhists
World Buddhist Sangha Council

References

Buddhist organisations based in India
Buddhist organizations established in the 21st century
Religious organizations established in 2013
International Buddhist organizations